Abandon All Ships is a Canadian metalcore band from Toronto, Ontario. Formed in 2006, it was signed domestically to Universal Music Canada via Underground Operations, along with an American deal to Rise Records and its imprint Velocity Records.

History

Formation and First EP (2006–2009)
Abandon All Ships was founded in 2006 in Toronto, Ontario, originally playing covers of Norma Jean songs. Most of the band members attended Dante Alighieri Academy, including lead vocalist Angelo Aita, keyboardist Sebastian Cassisi-Nunez, and original guitarist David Stephens; Toronto friends Martin Broda and Francesco Pallotta were added on bass and drums respectively. In 2007, Nick Fiorini was added on rhythm guitar.

By 2008, the band had released four demo songs online: "Megawacko", "When Dreams Become Nightmares", "Brendon's Song" and "Pedestrians Is Another Word for Speedbump". After rising in the Toronto scene, the group toured and opened for many larger bands in their same genre, such as Silverstein. By the end of 2008, Nick Fiorini had been replaced by Andrew Paiano. By then, the band had recorded their self-titled EP and quickly became popular on the Internet through Myspace. They were given even more exposure after their  appearance on the MuchMusic's Canadian television program Disband and began playing shows outside of Ontario.

Because Christian themes regularly appear in the band's music, some thought that Abandon All Ships was a Christian band, but it was not; its regular use of profanity and suggestive lyrics eventually settled the debate.

Geeving (2009–2010)
At the end of 2009, David Stephens and Francesco Pallotta left the band; they were replaced by Kyler Browne on lead guitar and, on drums, Daniel Paiano (Andrew's brother). In early 2010, the group was signed to Underground Operations, Rise Records, and Velocity Records. On June 29, 2010, they released their first single, "Take One Last Breath"; the music video premiered online the same day. They played at the 2010 Bluesfest in Ottawa, performing new songs "Geeving", "Guardian Angel" (which features Lena Katina from the Russian band t.A.T.u.), "Maria (I Like It Loud)", and "Take One Last Breath", all of which were to appear on the up-coming album, Geeving. (The name of the album is taken from its Urban Dictionary definition,[16] "Couldn't care less. Don't give a shit. Leave me alone. Fuck off. Happy Thanks Geeving."[17]

The single "Megawacko 2.0" was released on iTunes on August 24, 2010, with the video premiering on MuchMusic that same day. In September, "Bro My God" also premiered via online streaming. Abandon All Ships was then included on the Monument tour from October 29, 2010 to December 5, 2010 with Miss May I, Sleeping with Sirens, The Crimson Armada, and Bury Tomorrow.

Lineup instability, Infamous (2011–2012)

On January 24, 2011, lead guitarist Kyler Browne left the band and was replaced by Daniel Ciccotelli. Abandon All Ships participated in the 2011 Vans Warped Tour for selected dates on the east leg.

On July 14, 2011 the Paiano brothers, Andrew (rhythm guitar) and Daniel (drums), left the band.

On January 18, 2012, the band announced that they were in the process of recording their second studio album. The title was announced as Infamous, and it was released on July 3, 2012. The video for its title track was released on the first of May with its environment and direction being described as "very Toronto".

On November 29, 2012, the band was announced as support for For the Fallen Dreams European/UK tour beginning in March alongside fellow supporting acts Dream On, Dreamer, and No Bragging Rights. On December 14, drummer Chris Taylor left the band.

Malocchio, and Breakup (2013–2014)
The band announced their third full-length album Malocchio on December 20, 2013, which was released in 2014. Along with the announcement, the band streamed the album's first single, "Reefer Madness" on YouTube. On January 25, 2014 the band released the second single, "Cowboys".

On August 5, 2014, the band was announced to go on a short tour with Dance Gavin Dance and Stolas beginning at the end of August and on the 15th of that same month, guitarist Daniel Ciccotelli left the band.

Abandon All Ships announced its breakup on August 15, 2014 and played their last show on September 25 in Toronto with current and past members. Some members went on to a form a new band, Sine of the Lion. Martin Broda started a new band, Cherry Pools.

Reformation and new single (2016) 
The band reformed to release one new single titled "Loafting", which features the band's original line-up, except for Kyler Browne, and with the addition of Daniel Ciccotelli.

Cover Rereleases (2020) 

On October 30th, the band officially released their cover of Scooter's song "Maria (I Like It Loud)" on streaming services, 10 years after its unofficial release alongside Geeving. 

On November 3rd, the band released their cover of Drake's "We'll Be Fine" on streaming services. "We'll Be Fine" was a 9 year old cover but hadn't been released on streaming services prior.

Musical style
The band's third album incorporates elements from their first and second albums, plus new elements as keyboardist Sebastian Cassisi-Nunez brought in more of an EDM influence. Allmusic's Gregory Heaney described the group as "an electronicore band who fused metalcore with EDM" besides stating that they "combine elements of electronic music and post-hardcore and technical metal into a strangely triumphant hybrid. The band cites Metallica, Anthrax, Pantera, Alice in Chains, Avenged Sevenfold, Linkin Park, Slipknot, Lamb of God, Benny Benassi, Gigi D'Agostino, Hardwell, Tiësto, deadmau5, Lordz of Brooklyn and Beastie Boys as influences.

Members
Final Lineup
 Angelo Aita – harsh vocals (2006–2014, 2016)
 Sebastian Cassisi-Nunez – keyboards, programming, electronics (2006–2014, 2016) 
 Daniel Paiano – drums (2009–2011, 2016)
 Andrew Paiano – rhythm guitar (2008–2011, 2016)
 Martin Broda – clean vocals (2006–2014, 2016), bass guitar (2009–2014, 2016), drums (2006–2009) 
 Daniel Ciccotelli – lead guitar (2011–2013, 2016)

Former
 David Stephens – lead guitar (2006–2009)
 Francesco Pallotta – bass guitar (2006–2009)
 Nick Fiorini – rhythm guitar (2007–2008)
 Chris Taylor – drums (2011–2013)
 Kyler Browne – lead guitar (2009–2011, 2013–2014)
 Melvin Murray – drums (2013–2014)

Timeline

Discography

Studio albums

EPs

Music videos
 "Take One Last Breath" (2010)
 "Megawacko2.1" (2010)
 "Geeving" (2011)
 "Infamous" (2012)
 "August" (2012)
 "Less Than Love"  (2013)
 "Trapped" (2014)
 "Loafting" (2016)

References

Musical groups established in 2006
Musical quintets
Musical groups from Toronto
Universal Music Group artists
Rise Records artists
2006 establishments in Ontario
2014 disestablishments in Ontario
Musical groups reestablished in 2016
Canadian metalcore musical groups
Electronicore musical groups
Canadian people of Italian descent